Rafael Jerome Pérez (born May 15, 1982) is a Dominican former left-handed professional baseball relief pitcher. He was signed by the Cleveland Indians as an undrafted free agent in January 2002 and played with them through 2012. He lives in Freeport, New York, on Long Island.

Professional career

Cleveland Indians
In 2002, Pérez finished second in the Dominican Summer League with a 0.96 ERA. In , he was named Appalachian League Pitcher of the Year playing for the Single-A Burlington Indians and led the Appalachian League in wins (9-3) and ERA (1.70).In , his 12 wins tied for 3rd in Indians organization and he had a 2.62 ERA in 29 combined appearances (22 starts) for Kinston and Akron. He was added to the Indians 40-man roster in November. In , Pérez had a 2.81 ERA in 12 starts with Akron and a 2.63 ERA in 13 relief appearances with Triple-A Buffalo.

He made his MLB debut on April 20, against Baltimore, pitching one inning and striking out two.

Pérez was initially slated for long relief, but after he demonstrated his ability to pitch in tight situations, he was inserted into a setup role alongside right-handed reliever Rafael Betancourt. The two setup men were nicknamed Raffy Left and Raffy Right by local Indians fans. Pérez, with his hard fastball and tight slider, quickly became one of the most dominant relievers in the league. In 2007, Pérez posted a sparkling 1.78 ERA, over 60 innings pitched in 44 appearances. He had a WHIP (walks plus hits per inning pitched) of only .923, and held left-handed batters to just a .145 batting average. ESPN analyst Peter Gammons called him "arguably the best left-handed reliever on the planet."

2013: Boston, Minnesota
On February 14, 2013, Pérez signed a minor league contract with the Minnesota Twins. He was released on May 17 after appearing in only four games for the Rochester Red Wings and signed with the Boston Red Sox organization on May 23. With the AA Portland Sea Dogs, he pitched in 25 games and was 2-2 with a 2.64 ERA.

2014: Texas, Mexico, Pittsburgh
He signed a minor league deal with the Texas Rangers on January 18, 2014 but only appeared in four games for the Round Rock Express before he was released on April 17. He spent the next few months in the Mexican League with the Rojos del Águila de Veracruz where he was 3-5 with a 3.92 ERA in 10 games, including 8 starts. He signed a minor league deal with the Pittsburgh Pirates on July 12, 2014 and pitched for the AAA Indianapolis Indians where he was 3-1 with a 1.77 ERA in 10 games (another 8 starts).

Seattle Mariners
Pérez signed a minor league contract with the Seattle Mariners on February 12, 2015. He was invited to spring training, but did not make the team. His release was announced on July 2.

Tigres de Quintana Roo
On March 28, 2016, Pérez signed with the Tigres de Quintana Roo of the Mexican Baseball League.

Long Island Ducks
On March 28, 2017, Perez signed with the Long Island Ducks of the Atlantic League of Professional Baseball. He became a free agent after the 2017 season.

References

External links

1982 births
Living people
Akron Aeros players
Buffalo Bisons (minor league) players
Burlington Indians players (1986–2006)
Cleveland Indians players
Chunichi Dragons players
Columbus Clippers players
Dominican Republic expatriate baseball players in Japan
Dominican Republic expatriate baseball players in Mexico
Dominican Republic expatriate baseball players in the United States
Gigantes del Cibao players
Indianapolis Indians players
Kinston Indians players
Lake County Captains players

Long Island Ducks players
Major League Baseball players from the Dominican Republic
Major League Baseball pitchers
Mexican League baseball pitchers
Nippon Professional Baseball pitchers
Portland Sea Dogs players
Rochester Red Wings players
Rojos del Águila de Veracruz players
Round Rock Express players
Tigres de Quintana Roo players
World Baseball Classic players of the Dominican Republic
2009 World Baseball Classic players